The California montane chaparral and woodlands is an ecoregion defined by the World Wildlife Fund, spanning  of mountains in the Transverse Ranges, Peninsular Ranges, and Coast Ranges of southern and central California. The ecoregion is part of the larger California chaparral and woodlands ecoregion, and belongs to the Mediterranean forests, woodlands, and scrub biome.

Geography
The ecoregion spreads from low foothills up to the highest peaks of the following ranges: San Bernardino Mountains, San Jacinto Mountains, San Gabriel Mountains, Santa Susana Mountains, Santa Monica Mountains, Sierra Pelona, Topatopa Mountains, Tehachapi Mountains, San Rafael Mountains, Santa Ynez Mountains, and the long Santa Lucia Mountains.

The wide elevation range and characteristic climate produce a variety of natural communities, from chaparral to mixed evergreen forest to alpine tundra.

Climate
The region's Mediterranean climate is hot and dry in the summer and cool and wet in the winter. Mid-summer monsoonal thunderstorms often form over the Transverse and Peninsular Ranges of Southern California, introducing additional rain to the region.

Ecology

Flora

Shrublands of Chamise, Manzanita species, and scrub oak tend to dominate the lower elevations of California montane chaparral and woodlands. This ecoregion contains several oak species, including coast live oak, canyon live oak (golden-cup oak), interior live oak, tan oak, and Engelmann oak. It has eight endemic conifer species.

A mosaic of different manzanita species and closed-cone pine forest appears at higher elevations. Bigcone Douglas-fir, Pseudotsuga macrocarpa, is a notable resident of some of these communities. The Mediterranean California Lower Montane Black Oak-Conifer Forest plant community occurs here.

Higher elevations to  support subalpine forests of limber pine, lodgepole pine, and Jeffrey pine.

Hesperoyucca whipplei, colloquially known as Chaparral Yucca, is commonplace throughout the lower elevations of the climate zone.

Fauna

The region contains many species of small vertebrate, including the western fence lizard, white-eared pocket mouse, several species of kangaroo rat, and the endangered mountain yellow-legged frog. The area includes some larger predators such as the black bear, mountain lion, bobcat, coyote, ring-tailed cats, and the critically endangered California condor.

The monarch butterfly winters within the coastal woodlands this ecoregion.

Conservation status
Approximately 30 percent of California montane chaparral and woodlands remains intact. About 70 percent has been lost due to degradation activities of humans. Montane chaparral is threatened chiefly by development, grazing, logging, conversion to vineyards, and too-frequent wildfire.

This is an ongoing threat notably in Southern California, but also in its northernmost reaches in Monterey County, where population pressure is most intense. Major urban centers located within this ecoregion include Monterey, Santa Barbara, Tehachapi, and the foothill portions of various cities fronting the San Gabriel and San Bernardino Mountains.

State and federal fish and wildlife agencies, and environmental associations are attempting to conserve the remaining intact ecoregion. The U.S. Forest Service efforts include timber harvest conservation measures in areas with endangered tree species and high endemic and relict species plant communities. Much of the range is within the Los Padres National Forest, Angeles National Forest, and San Bernardino National Forest. Mixed conifer and closed-cone pine forests have been heavily impacted by air pollution. Air quality has improved in southern montane areas around the Los Angeles Basin, since implementation of smog reduction policies and practices in the latter 20th century.

See also
California chaparral and woodlands ecoregion
California coastal sage and chaparral — sub-ecoregion
California interior chaparral and woodlands — sub-ecoregion
California oak woodland — plant community
Maritime coast range ponderosa pine forest — plant community
Mediterranean California Lower Montane Black Oak-Conifer Forest — plant community
List of ecoregions in the United States (WWF)

References

External links

 

California chaparral and woodlands

Ecoregions of California
Plant communities of California

montane
Forests of California
Montane forests